Seaforth Channel is a channel in the Central Coast region of the Canadian province of British Columbia which is part of the Inside Passage - the  passage between Seattle, Washington and Juneau, Alaska. The marine highway goes through Seaforth Channel on the way to Milbanke Sound, one of the open sea portions of the Inland Passage. Seaforth Channel which is part of the Prince Rupert/Port Hardy BC ferry route, extends in a westerly direction from Denny Island to Milbanke Sound between Denny Island, Campbell Island and the Wright group of islands on the south. In October 2016, a Texas-owned tug/barge transiting the Canadian waters of the Inside Passage without a local pilot was hard grounded on a reef at the entrance to Seaforth Channel in October 2016.
Clean up response and salvage was criticized by the Heiltsuk, B.C. Premier Christy Clark and Prime Minister Justin Trudeau. In November in Vancouver the Prime Minister announced a $1.5B ocean protection plan to "create a marine safety system, restore marine ecosystems and undertake research into oil spill cleanup methods."

Physical features
Lama Passage extends from Seaforth Channel to Fitzburgh Sound with Dryad Point across from Saunders Island at the junction. "Wood Island and Ark Island are close offshore at the junction of Seaforth Channel and Troup Passage. Newby Island, Munsie Point and Christiansen Point lie  WNW of Ark Island.

Ivory Island with its lighthouse is the northwest entrance point to Seaforth Channel. Since the nineteenth century, it was well-known that the "north shores of Seaforth Channel [were] much more irregular in outline than the southern shores." The area surrounding the Beazley Islands which lie southeast of Dearth Island and north of Nose Island, "is encumbered with numerous small islets and drying and below-water rocks."

The south shore of Seaforth Channel is not as irregular as the north side. After Athlone, Dufferin, Horsfall and Campbell islands the channel makes a sharp turn to the passage between Campbell Island and Denny Island. It extends along Denny Island to the junction with Lama Passage between Hunter Island and Denny Island. The tug/barge that ran aground on Edge Reef off Athlone Island at the entrance to the Seaforth Channel in October 2016 was heading south.

Denniston Point on Dufferin Island, Idol Point on the south side of the channel and Bush Point are located on Seaforth Channel.

Inside Passage shipping route

 The inland passage refers to a coastal shipping route along a network of passages which weave through the islands on the Pacific coast of North America from Alaska to Washington. Marine traffic prefers to use the inside passage when weather makes travel on the open Pacific Ocean more challenging. It is now a marine highway with cruise ships, freighters, tugs with tows, fishing craft and ships of the Alaska Marine Highway, BC Ferries, and Washington State Ferries.

By 1880, the shipping route that was "usually adopted by steamers and others desiring to make the inland passage from Queen Charlotte Sound to Dixon Entrance, is by way of Fitzhugh Sound, Lama Passage, Seaforth Channel, Milbank Sound, Finlayson and Grenville channels, and Chatham Sound
tn Dixon Entrance." Lama Passage connected Seaforth Channel with Fisher Channel. The Seaforth Channel and Lama Passage meet at the northern end of Campbell Island.

Marine traffic on the central coast prefer Seaforth Channel especially "when weather makes travel difficult further offshore."

On October 13, 2016, just after 1 a.m, a Texas-owned articulated tug/barge—a  tugboat, the Nathan E Stewart, secured to the stern of an empty  petroleum barge DBL 55—ran hard aground on the Edge Reef off Athlone Island at the entrance to Seaforth Channel in the Heiltsuk Nation's traditional territorial waters. contaminating the Seaforth Channel area with "more than 100,000 litres of fuel." Although the Seaforth Channel is part of the Voluntary Tanker Exclusion Zone, the Nathan E. Stewart which is a U.S. vessel under 10,000 gross tonnage was allowed to operate by the Pacific Pilotage Authority, "without a local pilot on the West Coast of Canada." This is a common practice "if the crew meets a minimum standard of experience and licensing." None of the seven-member crew of the Nathan E Stewart were injured. The fuel spill threatens "dozens of species that are harvested in the area, including manila clam beds that provide income of up to $150,000 per year for the community." A shellfish harvesting ban was imposed on October 14. The fuel spill is in the environmentally sensitive Great Bear Rainforest - the largest intact old-growth forest in the world. The operator responsible for the tug and barge are Kirby Offshore Marine, a Texas-based operator. In 2011 when the Nathan E Stewart lost power and was set adrift in rough waters of Alaska, journalists at the time drew attention to the Pacific Pilotage Authority waiver that exempted the barge which makes routine weekly runs "between Vancouver and Alaska through the Inside Passage" "from the requirement of having Canadian pilots on board." Following the October incident, the Pacific Pilotage Authority revoked the barge's waiver. The Canadian Coast Guard who were leading the cleanup, arrived on scene at 2:19 a.m. at CCG Station Bella Bella. They called in the Western Canada Marine Response Corporation (WCMRC) at 4:30 am and their vessels and crew from Vancouver and Prince Rupert arrived on site at 5:30 pm. A "mobile skimming vessel, boom skiff, work boat, and tug, along with a total of 2,500 feet of boom" were on site. The tugboat "settled under nine metres of water in Seaforth Channel." By October 26 the tanks of fuel on the submerged tug had been pumped out and "110,131 litres of an oil-water mixture" were recovered but oil was discovered in at "least three coves in Seaforth Channel." Bad weather prevented the salvage operation. Resolve Pioneer, a salvage vessel arrived in Bella Bella on November 8. and the damaged Nathan E. Stewart was raised from the sea floor on November 14. It was hauled to Surrey, B.C. on November 19 but cleanup continued. The Heiltsuk, B.C. Premier Christy Clark and Prime Minister Justin Trudeau criticized the oil spill response as "inadequate" and "unacceptable." The incident highlighted concerns about lack of capacity of existing response teams as on the eve of proposed pipelines which would lead to even more tanker traffic on the Inside Passage. On November 6 in Bella Bella Federal Minister of Transportation Marc Garneau met briefly with Heiltsuk hereditary and elected chiefs and on November 7 in Vancouver Prime Minister Trudeau announced a $1.5B ocean protection plan which will "creating a marine safety system, restoring marine ecosystems and research into oil spill cleanup methods."

See also
British Columbia Coast
List of islands of British Columbia
BC Ferries
Alaska Marine Highway
List of lighthouses in British Columbia

References

Straits of British Columbia
Central Coast of British Columbia
Heiltsuk
Range 3 Coast Land District